Liudmila Sirotkina (born April 17, 1981) is a Kyrgyzstani modern pentathlete. She placed 23rd in the women's individual event at the 2004 Summer Olympics.

References

External links
 

1981 births
Living people
Kyrgyzstani female modern pentathletes
Olympic modern pentathletes of Kyrgyzstan
Modern pentathletes at the 2004 Summer Olympics
Kyrgyzstani people of Russian descent